Luke Elliot (born June 30, 1984) is an American musician, producer, and actor.

Biography
Luke Elliot was born on June 30, 1984, in Princeton, New Jersey, the second of five children, to Lorna Silver, a poet, and Norbert Elliot, an English language professor. He grew up in Lawrence Township, Mercer County, New Jersey. He currently resides in Europe.

Career 
Playing in New York's Lower East Side, Elliot and his band made their way from the small bar scene to some of New York's more popular venues. Director Paul Cantagallo asked Elliot to compose the music for his film, Benny the Bum, which won Best Local Film at the 2012 Philadelphia Independent Film Festival. Elliot began headlining Philadelphia venues such as North Star and World Cafe Live. After a chance meeting with an influential journalist led to his music being promoted in Norway's biggest daily newspaper, Luke traveled for the first time outside of the U.S. to Norway in 2014.

There, he formed a band, toured the country, and recorded his debut album, Dressed for the Occasion with producer John Agnello in Halden, Norway at Athletic Studio.  The album was released in 2015, and Luke toured Europe and the world to enthusiastic response. Soon after, he moved permanently to Oslo, met and married a Norwegian woman, and had a child.

Luke’s evocatively titled sophomore album, The Big Wind, released in 2020, is a barometer of these turbulent times.  It is a boldly textured and instantly immersive album with a film noir-ish touch that is simultaneously sleek and modern at the eye of the storm. “These songs have to do with a pull to come into a stable existence,” Luke explains. “While writing them, I had no permanent residence, but I stopped being a mess and I scrambled to get this record done.”

Rolling Stone France picked “The Big Wind” as its Album Of The Month upon release and referred to Luke as an "undeniable talent combined with a truly stunning voice." MOJO Magazine in the UK called him “…a master of accessible, twisted, gothic Americana.”

His two critically acclaimed albums and EP, part of his growing discography, have garnered top scores and rave reviews.  He has toured and sold out venues all over the world, and is especially cherished by his European fan base. New singles, collaborations, and a third record are expected in 2022.

Elliot is also an accomplished actor, and has appeared alongside Carrie-Ann Moss in the hits series “Wisting.”  He has also been featured in Thomas Giersten’s, “Helt Perfekt,” Øystein Karlsen’s, “Exit,” and narrated for Gry Hivju’s, “Fearless,” starring collaborator and friend, Kristofer Hivju.

Style and influences
Elliot has been described as having a dark crooning style, with a traditional, melancholic and melodic sound. He has garnered favorable comparisons to roots, folk, and rock icons such as Hank Williams, Big Joe Turner, PJ Harvey, and Nick Cave.

Discography
 Provisions (2014)
 Dressed for the Occasion (2016) 
 The Big Wind (2020)

References

Living people
American male singer-songwriters
Singer-songwriters from New Jersey
1985 births
American male composers
21st-century American composers
Lawrence High School (New Jersey) alumni
Mercer County Community College alumni
People from Lawrence Township, Mercer County, New Jersey
People from Princeton, New Jersey
Musicians from Jersey City, New Jersey
21st-century American singers
21st-century American male singers
Singer-songwriters from New York (state)